Denys Oleksandrovych Boyko (born 29 January 1988) is a Ukrainian professional footballer who plays as a goalkeeper for Dynamo Kyiv.

Club career

Dynamo Kyiv 
A product of Dynamo Kyiv youth system, Boyko made his senior team debut in a match against Metalurh Zaporizhzhia on 9 May 2010.

Dnipro Dnipropetrovsk 
Boyko played 18 matches in Dnipro's 2014–15 UEFA Europa League campaign, including the final, which they lost 3–2 to holders Sevilla FC in Warsaw.

On 24 November 2015, Boyko was named a UEFA team of the year nominee after conceding just 0.75 goals per a game, the lowest among goal keeper nominees.  The other three nominees were Joe Hart of Manchester City and England, Gianluigi Buffon of Juventus and Italy, and Manuel Neuer of Bayern Munich and Germany.

Beşiktaş 
On 21 January 2016, Boyko signed a four-year contract with Turkish club Beşiktaş. On 31 August 2016, he was loaned to La Liga side Málaga CF, for one year.

On 10 February 2018, it was announced that Boyko would return to Dynamo Kyiv on loan, until the end of the 2017–18 season.

Dynamo Kyiv 
After six months on loan back at his native club, Boyko signed a full contract with Dynamo Kyiv.

International career

On 18 November 2014, Boyko made his debut for Ukraine in a 0–0 friendly draw against Lithuania. Since then, Boyko has been the substitute of Shakhtar Donetsk's goalkeeper, Andriy Pyatov.

Career statistics

Club

International

Honours
Dnipro Dnipropetrovsk
UEFA Europa League: runner-up 2014–15

Beşiktaş
Süper Lig: 2015–16

Dynamo Kyiv
Ukrainian Premier League: 2020–21

References

External links
 
 
Boyko at Kyiv Official Website

1988 births
Living people
Ukrainian footballers
Ukraine international footballers
Ukraine youth international footballers
Ukraine under-21 international footballers
Ukrainian expatriate footballers
FC Dynamo Kyiv players
FC Dynamo-2 Kyiv players
FC Dynamo-3 Kyiv players
FC CSKA Kyiv players
FC Obolon-Brovar Kyiv players
FC Kryvbas Kryvyi Rih players
FC Dnipro players
Beşiktaş J.K. footballers
Málaga CF players
Ukrainian Premier League players
Ukrainian First League players
Ukrainian Second League players
Süper Lig players
La Liga players
Expatriate footballers in Turkey
Ukrainian expatriate sportspeople in Turkey
Association football goalkeepers
UEFA Euro 2016 players
Expatriate footballers in Spain
Ukrainian expatriate sportspeople in Spain
Footballers from Kyiv